Gian Stone is an American songwriter and record producer from New York City. He topped the Billboard Hot 100 Producer Chart in May 2020.

His work includes co-writing and production of Justin Bieber and Ariana Grande's "Stuck with U", Maroon 5's "Girls Like You", Marshmello and Halsey's "Be Kind"), and the Jonas Brothers "Like It's Christmas"), as well as songs with John Legend, Jimmie Allen, Ava Max, and more."  He has vocal produced for artists including Katy Perry, Madonna, Dua Lipa, Jonas Brothers, Selena Gomez, Ellie Goulding, SZA, Bebe Rexha, Maroon 5, Keith Urban, and Rufus Du Sol. He was nominated for a Best Engineered Album, Non-Classical Grammy Award in 2018 for his work on Head Over Heels by Chromeo., and a Grammy Award for Album of the Year in 2021, for his work on Justice (Justin Bieber album).

Discography

Production and songwriting

Vocal Production

Engineering credits

Vocals

References 

Songwriters from New York (state)
American record producers
Year of birth missing (living people)
Living people